Katia Ragusa (born 19 May 1997) is an Italian professional racing cyclist, who currently rides for UCI Women's Continental Team .

See also
 List of 2016 UCI Women's Teams and riders

References

External links
 

1997 births
Living people
Italian female cyclists
People from Schio
Cyclists from the Province of Vicenza